Quinizarine Green SS, also called Solvent Green 3 is  an anthraquinone derivative. It is a black powder that is soluble in polar organic solvents, but insoluble in water. It is used as a dye for adding greenish coloring to cosmetics and medications. It is used in some colored smoke formulations.

According to X-ray crystallography, the anthroquinone portion of the molecule is planar.  Both amine protons form hydrogen bonds to the carbonyls.

This dye is a component in some smoke grenades, and questions have been raised about its toxicity.

References

Solvent dyes
Anthraquinone dyes
Aromatic amines